This is an alphabetically ordered list of Corydoras species.

Each entry includes: binomial scientific name, describer and year of publication.

Some entries are indicated with existing (common name) and synonyms.

Species
There are currently 161 recognized species in this genus:
Recent Species

 Corydoras acrensis Nijssen, 1972 (Acre corydoras)
 Corydoras acutus Cope, 1872 (Blacktop corydoras)
 Corydoras adolfoi W. E. Burgess, 1982 (Adolfo's catfish)
 Corydoras aeneus (T. N. Gill, 1858) (Bronze corydoras) - Synonyms: Hoplosoma aeneum, C. microps, C. venezuelanus, C. macrosteus & C. schultzei 
 Corydoras agassizii Steindachner, 1877 (Spotted corydoras)
 Corydoras albolineatus Knaack, 2004 
 Corydoras amandajanea Sands, 1995
 Corydoras amapaensis Nijssen, 1972 (Amapa corydoras)
 Corydoras ambiacus Cope, 1872 (Spotted corydoras)
 Corydoras amphibelus Cope, 1872
 Corydoras apiaka Espindola, Spencer, L. R. Rocha & Britto, 2014
 Corydoras approuaguensis Nijssen & Isbrücker, 1983
 Corydoras araguaiaensis Sands, 1990
 Corydoras arcuatus Elwin, 1938 (Skunk corydoras) 
 Corydoras areio Knaack, 2000
 Corydoras armatus (Günther, 1868)
 Corydoras atropersonatus S. H. Weitzman & Nijssen, 1970
 Corydoras aurofrenatus C. H. Eigenmann & C. H. Kennedy, 1903
 Corydoras axelrodi Rössel, 1962 (Pink corydoras)
 Corydoras baderi Geisler, 1969 - Synonym: C. oelemariensis
 Corydoras bicolor Nijssen & Isbrücker, 1967
 Corydoras bifasciatus Nijssen, 1972 (Twostripe corydoras)
 Corydoras bilineatus Knaack, 2002
 Corydoras blochi Nijssen, 1971 (Spotback corydoras)
 Corydoras boehlkei Nijssen & Isbrücker, 1982
 Corydoras boesemani Nijssen & Isbrücker, 1967
 Corydoras bondi Gosline, 1940 (Blackstripe corydoras)
 Corydoras breei Isbrücker & Nijssen, 1992
 Corydoras brevirostris Fraser-Brunner, 1947 - Synonym: C. melanistius brevirostris
 Corydoras britskii (Nijssen & Isbrücker, 1983) (Britski's Catfish)
 Corydoras burgessi H. R. Axelrod, 1987
 Corydoras carlae Nijssen & Isbrücker, 1983
 Corydoras caudimaculatus Rössel, 1961 (Tailspot corydoras)
 Corydoras cervinus Rössel, 1962
 Corydoras cochui G. S. Myers & S. H. Weitzman, 1954 (Barredtail corydoras)
 Corydoras concolor S. H. Weitzman, 1961 (Concolor corydoras)
 Corydoras condiscipulus Nijssen & Isbrücker, 1980
 Corydoras copei Nijssen & Isbrücker, 1986
 Corydoras coppenamensis Nijssen, 1970 - Synonym: C. bondi coppenamensis
 Corydoras coriatae W. E. Burgess, 1997
 Corydoras crimmeni S. Grant, 1997
 Corydoras cruziensis Knaack, 2002
 Corydoras crypticus Sands, 1995
 Corydoras davidsandsi B. K. Black, 1987 (Sands's corydoras)
 Corydoras delphax Nijssen & Isbrücker, 1983 (False blochi catfish)
 Corydoras difluviatilis Britto & R. M. C. Castro, 2002
 Corydoras diphyes Axenrot & S. O. Kullander, 2003 
 Corydoras duplicareus Sands, 1995 (Duplicate corydoras)
 Corydoras ehrhardti Steindachner, 1910 - Synonym: C. meridionalis
 Corydoras elegans Steindachner, 1876 (Elegant corydoras) - Synonym: C. pestai 
 Corydoras ellisae Gosline, 1940
 Corydoras ephippifer Nijssen, 1972 (Saddle corydoras)
 Corydoras eques Steindachner, 1876
 Corydoras esperanzae D. M. Castro, 1987
 Corydoras evelynae Rössel, 1963
 Corydoras filamentosus Nijssen & Isbrücker, 1983
 Corydoras flaveolus R. Ihering (pt), 1911 
 Corydoras fowleri J. E. Böhlke, 1950
Corydoras fulleri Tencatt, Evers, H-G & Britto 2021.
 Corydoras garbei R. Ihering (pt), 1911
 Corydoras geoffroy Lacépède, 1803 - Synonym: C. octocirrus
 Corydoras geryi Nijssen & Isbrücker, 1983 - Synonym: C. bolivianus
 Corydoras gladysae Calviño & Felipe Alonso, 2010
 Corydoras gomezi D. M. Castro, 1986
 Corydoras gossei Nijssen, 1972 (Palespotted corydoras)
 Corydoras gracilis Nijssen & Isbrücker, 1976
 Corydoras griseus Holly, 1940 (Grey corydoras)
 Corydoras gryphus Tencatt, Britto & Pavanelli, 2014
 Corydoras guapore Knaack, 1961 (Guapore corydoras)
 Corydoras guianensis Nijssen, 1970
 Corydoras habrosus S. H. Weitzman, 1960 (Salt and pepper catfish)
 Corydoras haraldschultzi Knaack, 1962 (Mosaic corydoras) 
 Corydoras hastatus C. H. Eigenmann & R. S. Eigenmann, 1888 (Dwarf corydoras) - Synonym: C. australe
 Corydoras heteromorphus Nijssen, 1970
 Corydoras imitator Nijssen & Isbrücker, 1983 (Imitator corydoras)
 Corydoras incolicana W. E. Burgess, 1993
 Corydoras isbrueckeri Knaack, 2004 
 Corydoras julii Steindachner, 1906 (Leopard corydoras) 
 Corydoras kanei S. Grant, 1998
 Corydoras lacerdai Hieronimus, 1995
 Corydoras lacrimostigmata Tencatt, Britto & Pavanelli, 2014
 Corydoras lamberti Nijssen & Isbrücker, 1986
 Corydoras latus N. E. Pearson, 1924
 Corydoras leopardus G. S. Myers, 1933 - Synonym: C. funnelli
 Corydoras leucomelas C. H. Eigenmann & W. R. Allen, 1942 (False spotted catfish) - Synonym: C. caquetae
 Corydoras longipinnis Knaack, 2007
 Corydoras loretoensis Nijssen & Isbrücker, 1986
 Corydoras loxozonus Nijssen & Isbrücker, 1983
 Corydoras lymnades Tencatt, Vera Alcaraz, Britto & Pavanelli, 2013
 Corydoras maculifer Nijssen & Isbrücker, 1971 (Dotted corydoras)
 Corydoras mamore Knaack, 2002
 Corydoras melanistius Regan, 1912 (Bluespotted corydoras) - Synonym: C. wotroi
 Corydoras melanotaenia Regan, 1912 (Green gold catfish)
 Corydoras melini Lönnberg & Rendahl (de), 1930 (Bandit corydoras) 
 Corydoras metae C. H. Eigenmann, 1914 (Masked corydoras) 
 Corydoras micracanthus Regan, 1912
 Corydoras microcephalus Regan, 1912
 Corydoras multimaculatus Steindachner, 1907
 Corydoras nanus Nijssen & Isbrücker, 1967 (Little corydoras)
 Corydoras napoensis Nijssen & Isbrücker, 1986
 Corydoras narcissus Nijssen & Isbrücker, 1980
 Corydoras nattereri Steindachner, 1877 (Blue corydoras) - Synonyms: C. juquiaae & C. nattereri triseriatus
 Corydoras negro Knaack, 2004 
 Corydoras nijsseni Sands, 1989 (Nijssen's corydoras) - Synonym: C. elegans nijsseni
 Corydoras noelkempffi Knaack, 2004 
 Corydoras oiapoquensis Nijssen, 1972
 Corydoras ornatus Nijssen & Isbrücker, 1976
 Corydoras orphnopterus S. H. Weitzman & Nijssen, 1970
 Corydoras ortegai Britto, F. C. T. Lima & Hidalgo, 2007
 Corydoras osteocarus J. E. Böhlke, 1951
 Corydoras ourastigma Nijssen, 1972
 Corydoras oxyrhynchus Nijssen & Isbrücker, 1967
 Corydoras paleatus (Jenyns, 1842) (Peppered corydoras) - Synonyms: C. maculatus, C. marmoratus, Silurus quadricostatus & Silurus 7-radiatus 
 Corydoras panda Nijssen & Isbrücker, 1971 (Panda corydoras)
 Corydoras pantanalensis Knaack, 2001
 Corydoras paragua Knaack, 2004 
 Corydoras parallelus W. E. Burgess, 1993
 Corydoras pastazensis S. H. Weitzman, 1963 (Pastaza corydoras) - Synonym: C. pastazensis orcesi
 Corydoras paucerna Knaack, 2004 
 Corydoras petracinii Calviño & Felipe Alonso, 2010
 Corydoras pinheiroi Dinkelmeyer, 1995
 Corydoras polystictus Regan, 1912 - Synonym: C. virescens
 Corydoras potaroensis G. S. Myers, 1927
 Corydoras pulcher Isbrücker & Nijssen, 1973 (Pretty corydoras)
 Corydoras punctatus (Bloch, 1794) (Spotfin corydoras)
 Corydoras pygmaeus Knaack, 1966 (Pygmy corydoras)
 Corydoras rabauti La Monte, 1941 (Rusty corydoras) - Synonym: C. myersi
 Corydoras reticulatus Fraser-Brunner, 1938 (Reticulated corydoras) 
 Corydoras reynoldsi G. S. Myers & S. H. Weitzman, 1960
 Corydoras robineae W. E. Burgess, 1983 (Bannertail corydoras)
 Corydoras robustus Nijssen & Isbrücker, 1980
 Corydoras sanchesi Nijssen & Isbrücker, 1967
 Corydoras saramaccensis Nijssen, 1970
 Corydoras sarareensis Dinkelmeyer, 1995
 Corydoras schwartzi Rössel, 1963 (Schwartz's catfish)
 Corydoras semiaquilus S. H. Weitzman, 1964
 Corydoras septentrionalis Gosline, 1940 - Synonym: C. cortesi
 Corydoras serratus Sands, 1995
 Corydoras seussi Dinkelmeyer, 1996
 Corydoras similis Hieronimus, 1991
 Corydoras simulatus S. H. Weitzman & Nijssen, 1970
 Corydoras sipaliwini Hoedeman, 1965
 Corydoras sodalis Nijssen & Isbrücker, 1986 (False network catfish)
 Corydoras solox Nijssen & Isbrücker, 1983
 Corydoras spectabilis Knaack, 1999
 Corydoras spilurus Norman, 1926 (Pinkthroat corydoras)
 Corydoras splendens (Castelnau, 1855) (Emerald corydoras)
 Corydoras steindachneri Isbrücker & Nijssen, 1973 (Paraná corydoras)
 Corydoras stenocephalus C. H. Eigenmann & W. R. Allen, 1942
 Corydoras sterbai Knaack, 1962 (Sterba's corydoras) 
 Corydoras surinamensis Nijssen, 1970
 Corydoras sychri S. H. Weitzman, 1960 (Sychr's catfish)
 Corydoras treitlii Steindachner, 1906 (Longsnout corydoras)
 Corydoras trilineatus Cope, 1872 (Threestripe corydoras) - Synonyms: C. episcopi, C. dubius 
 Corydoras tukano Britto & F. C. T. Lima, 2003
 Corydoras undulatus Regan, 1912 
 Corydoras urucu Britto, Wosiacki & Montag, 2009
 Corydoras virginiae W. E. Burgess, 1993 (Miguelito corydoras)
 Corydoras vittatus Nijssen, 1971 - Synonym: C. blochi vittatus
 Corydoras weitzmani Nijssen, 1971 (Twosaddle corydoras)
 Corydoras xinguensis Nijssen, 1972 (Xingu corydoras)
 Corydoras zygatus C. H. Eigenmann & W. R. Allen, 1942 (Black band catfish)

Fossil Species
 †Corydoras revelatus Cockerell, 1925 Fossil species from the Late Paleocene

Notes

References
 Catalog of catfishes: 
 With regard to C-numbers: 

.
Corydoras
Corydoras
Corydoras species

sv:Corydoras